Be Together may refer to:

 "Be Together" (TM Network song), 1987; popularized by Ami Suzuki, 1999
 "Be Together" (Major Lazer song), 2015
 Be Together (film), 2015
 Be Together,  a 2022 album by BtoB